John Elwill may refer to:

Sir John Elwill, 1st Baronet (1643–1717), MP for Bere Alston
Sir John Elwill, 2nd Baronet (died 1727), of the Elwill baronets
Sir John Elwill, 4th Baronet (died 1778), MP for Guildford

See also
Elwill (surname)